Qurrat Ann Kadwani (born May 10, 1981) is an American television actress, playwright and film producer of Indian descent. She is known for They Call Me Q, Intrusion and The Fifth of November.

Early life and career

Kadwani was raised in New York, growing up in The Bronx. She a graduate of the Bronx High School of Science and received a double scholarship for theater at State University of New York at Geneseo. Kadwani is the first South Asian woman in a solo act play Off-Broadway. In an interview with The New York Times, she expressed how she grew up wanting to be living the lives of those she knew. Kadwani co-wrote, starred in and produced The Fifth of November in 2018.

They Call Me Q
Kadwani portrayed different characters including her parents, friends, teachers and classmates in They Call Me Q. The show was a 2014 solo performance at St. Luke's Theatre, University of Minnesota Crookston, Colorado State University, Lane Community College, Frostburg State University, and premiered at the Chicago Fringe Festival. Kadwani is the production's writer as well, which won Best Play at Maui Fringe Festival.

Intrusion

In 2018, Kadwani returned to Off-Broadway with Intrusion, a solo act discussing rape. The setting is two decades in the future and follows eight character portrayals by Kadwani. She performed at St Luke's Theatre.

Filmography

Film

Television

References

External links

 Qurrat Ann Kadwani at Moviefone

Living people
1981 births
Actresses from Mumbai
Film producers from Mumbai
Indian emigrants to the United States
Actresses from New York City
Film producers from New York (state)
American film actresses
American television actresses
American women film producers
American women dramatists and playwrights
American actresses of Indian descent
American women artists of Indian descent
American women writers of Indian descent
American Muslims
The Bronx High School of Science alumni
State University of New York at Geneseo alumni
21st-century American actresses
21st-century American screenwriters